Danah is a feminine given name, and may refer to:

 Danah Al-Nasrallah (born 1988), Kuwaiti sprinter
 danah boyd (born 1977), American social media scholar
 Danah Zohar (born 1945), American philosopher

Feminine given names